Titanio venustalis is a species of moth in the family Crambidae. It is found in Greece and the Republic of Macedonia.

References

Moths described in 1855
Odontiini
Moths of Europe
Taxa named by Julius Lederer